The Persian embassy to Europe (1599–1602) was dispatched by the Persian Shah Abbas I in 1599 to obtain an alliance against the Ottoman Empire.  The Persians had then been at war with the Ottoman Empire for more than a century, and so decided to try to obtain European help against the Ottomans.  Besides the territorial antagonism of the Ottoman and Persian realms, there was also strong religious antagonism, as the Persians proclaimed Shiism against the Ottoman Empire's Sunnism. The objective of the mission was to establish a European–Persian alliance against the Ottoman Turks. These Persian efforts at rapprochement with Europe followed the Persian defeat against the Ottoman Empire in the Ottoman–Safavid War (1578–1590).

Plan

The embassy was composed of one ambassador, Hossein Ali Beg, and four secretaries (First Secretary Uruch Beg, son of Sultan Ali Beg; the nephew of the ambassador 'Ali Quli Beg; and two others) and led by the English adventurer Sir Anthony Shirley. Shirley had sailed from Venice in May 1599 with 25 other Englishmen, and had found favour with King Abbas I.  Various contacts had already taken place between the Persians and Europe, as with the embassy of Anthony Jenkinson from Queen Elizabeth I in 1562.

The plan was to visit eight European courts, with one additional Special Envoy who would stay as the Persian ambassador at the court of Russian Emperor Boris Godunov. The embassy effectively met with three German potentates, and the Italian and Spanish courts, but initial plans to meet with the courts of France, England, Scotland and Poland were abandoned on the way.

Itinerary
The embassy left in July 1599 for Astrakhan. They reached Moscow in November 1599.  After a long voyage, they reached Prague in Bohemia in the autumn of 1600, where they met with emperor Rudolf II and were sumptuously received over the winter.  In Spring 1601 they set for Munich, where they met with William II, the former Duke of Bavaria.  They then went to Italy, where they were received by Vincenzo Gonzaga in Mantua.  The embassy failed to meet the Doge of Venice, as he declined an interview on the ground that he was meeting an ambassador from the Ottoman Empire.  The final portion of their mission took them to Spain, where they met with king Philip III, and obtained seaborne transportation from Portugal to the Strait of Hormuz and Persia. In a final incident however, one of the members of the embassy, a religious mullah, was stabbed to death by a Spaniard in Mérida. After discussions to obtain redress, the embassy set sail for Persia from Lisbon in early 1602.

Aftermath

The embassy was immediately followed by a new conflict between Persia and the Ottoman Empire, the Ottoman–Safavid War (1603–1618), in which the Persians succeeded partly through the major military reforms and modernizations organized by the Englishman Robert Shirley, brother of Anthony Sherley.

A second Persian embassy to Europe (1609–1615) would be set up, this time led by Robert Sherley himself, which went to Cracow, Prague, Florence, Rome, Madrid, London, and returned to Persia through the Great Mogul's India.

In 1616, a trade agreement was reached between Shah Abbas and the East India Company and in 1622 "a joint Anglo-Persian force expelled the Portuguese and Spanish traders from the Persian Gulf".

In 1624, Robert Sherley led another embassy to England in order to obtain trade agreements.

A Persian embassy to Louis XIV occurred in 1715.

See also
Habsburg-Persian alliance

Notes

References
 Guy Le Strange, Juan de Persia Don Juan of Persia: A Shi'ah Catholic 1560-1604 Routledge, 2004 .
 Don Juan of Persia - A Shi-Ah Catholic 1560-1604 Read Books, 2007 .
 Tabish Khair, Martin Leer, Justin D. Edwards, Hanna Ziadeh, Amitav Ghosh Other routes: 1500 years of African and Asian travel writing Indiana University Press, 2005 .
 Jean-Pierre Maquerlot, Michèle Willems Travel and drama in Shakespeare's time Cambridge University Press, 1996 .
 Badi Badiozamani, Ghazal Badiozamani Iran and America: Re-Kindling a Love Lost East West Understanding Pr., 2005 .

Voyages
16th century in Europe
17th century in Europe
16th century in Iran
17th century in Iran
Political history of Iran
Iran–United Kingdom relations
History of the foreign relations of Iran
Diplomatic missions of Safavid Iran